Ålgård (historic: Aalgaard) is the administrative centre of Gjesdal municipality in Rogaland county, Norway. The village includes the neighborhoods of Ålgård, Bærland, Fiskebekk, Opstad and Solås. The large lake Edlandsvatnet lies on the south side of the village, emptying into the river Figgjoelva which runs northwest to Sandnes.

Ålgård is mostly known for the Kongeparken amusement park, an old wool mill, and a local football team (Ålgård F.K.) playing in the Norwegian Second Division.  The Old Ålgård Church (built in 1917) and the new Ålgård Church (built in 2015) are both located in the village.  There is significant industries in Ålgård, primarily the wood, textile, and clothing industries.

Population
The village of Figgjo, located in neighboring Sandnes municipality sits directly adjacent to Ålgård, just over the municipal border. Statistics Norway considers Ålgård/Figgjo to be one large urban area straddling two municipalities. Together, Ålgård/Figgjo has 11,335 residents.

Notable residents
Leo Moracchioli - Frog Leap Studios.

Media gallery

References

Villages in Rogaland
Gjesdal